Shiva Worga  is a village development committee in Parsa District in the Narayani Zone of southern Nepal. At the time of the 2011 Nepal census it had a population of 6,491 people living in 933 individual households. There were 3,384 males and  3,107 females at the time of census.

References

Populated places in Parsa District